Salvador is a 1986 American war drama film co-written and directed by Oliver Stone. It stars James Woods as Richard Boyle, alongside Jim Belushi, Michael Murphy and Elpidia Carrillo, with John Savage and Cynthia Gibb in supporting roles. Stone co-wrote the screenplay with Boyle.

The film tells the story of an American journalist covering the Salvadoran Civil War who becomes entangled with both the FMLN and the right-wing military dictatorship while trying to rescue his girlfriend and her children. The film is highly sympathetic toward the left-wing revolutionaries and strongly critical of the US-supported military dictatorship, focusing on the murder of four American Catholic nuns, including Jean Donovan, and the assassination of Archbishop Óscar Romero by death squads. The film was nominated for two Academy Awards: Best Actor in a Leading Role (Woods) and Best Writing, Screenplay Written Directly for the Screen (Stone and Boyle).

Plot
Veteran photojournalist Richard Boyle (James Woods) has over 20 years of experience, and while he has good output, Boyle's substance abuse problems and his arrogance have marred his reputation and left him practically unemployable. One morning, he finds that his wife has abandoned him, and took their child with her. Broke and with no immediate prospects, Boyle and his close friend, Doctor Rock (Jim Belushi), an out-of-work disc jockey, head to El Salvador, where Boyle is convinced that he can do freelance work amidst the nation's political turmoil.  After arriving, Boyle asks to meet a general he met during the Football War, and he and Rock are taken to him in a school-turned-barracks where both discuss the situation and he learns that the Salvadoran Army is being supplied by the United States. Sensing that disaster is imminent in El Salvador, Boyle eventually decides to leave, but he is reunited with an old flame named María (Elpidia Carrillo) and her two children, and is motivated to help them escape the country.

In the meantime, Boyle and María go to a mass led by Archbishop Oscar Romero. During the mass, the Archbishop is assassinated by the far-right ARANA party while the army outside opens fire on the fleeing crowd with Boyle and Maria barely escaping. Afterwards, Boyle goes to the United States Embassy to convince the ambassador to cut aid for the Salvadoran government, but his suggestions are denied and he is told to leave the country for his own safety.

While attempting to get María out of the country, Boyle is harassed by military authorities, which eventually leads to the deaths of people either close to him or María. As rebels overrun the government forces in Santa Ana, Boyle witnesses them execute captured soldiers with the same cruelty the military had previously shown them, which greatly disgusts him. When the Salvadoran Army starts using American supplies to combat the rebels, Boyle's friend and fellow photojournalist, John Cassady (John Savage), is killed during the battle.

Boyle and María eventually leave the country for the United States. However, upon entering California, their bus is stopped by immigration officers and María allows herself to be deported alongside her children due to the guilt of leaving her home country behind while Boyle is arrested after desperately arguing with the officers.
An epilogue reveals that María and her children survived and were last rumored to be in a refugee camp in Guatemala; Doctor Rock eventually returned to San Francisco; Cassady's photos were published; Boyle is still looking for María and her children; and that El Salvador continues to receive American military aid.

Cast
James Woods as Richard Boyle
Jim Belushi as Doctor Rock
Michael Murphy as Ambassador Thomas Kelly
John Savage as John Cassady
Elpidia Carrillo as María
Cindy Gibb as Cathy Moore (based on Jean Donovan)
Tony Plana as Major Maximiliano Casanova (based on Roberto D'Aubuisson)
José Carlos Ruiz as Archbishop Oscar Romero

Release
The film was released in the United States on March 5, 1986. In the Philippines, the film was released by Pioneer Films as Guns, Goons, Gold on March 26, 1992.

Box office
The film was not successful at the box office, grossing a total of $1,500,000 in the United States.

Critical response
As of September 2022, Salvador holds a rating of 90% on Rotten Tomatoes based on 29 reviews with an average score of 7.7/10 and the consensus: "Despite its somewhat disjointed narrative, Oliver Stone's Salvador is a vivid and powerful political drama that sets an early tone for the director's similarly provocative future projects."

Salvador was popular among critics. Roger Ebert, a film critic for the Chicago Sun-Times, gave the movie three stars out of four and wrote, "The movie has an undercurrent of seriousness, and it is not happy about the chaos that we are helping to subsidize. But basically it's a character study — a portrait of a couple of burned-out free-lancers trying to keep their heads above water."

Walter Goodman of The New York Times wrote an unfavorable review, arguing that while "as an adventure film, [it] has plenty of speed, grit and grime", it depicts "improbable people doing implausible things" and in some cases deviates from reality "for the sake of heightening the drama and hammering in the political point". He also compared it to the work of Constantin Costa-Gavras, cinematically as well as politically.

Alex von Tunzelmann in The Guardian criticized the film's cartoonish characters and the mix of facts and fiction, for example given that Boyle did not try to enter the US with Maria and that no real reporter existed like Cassady whose photos Boyle published.

Accolades
The film garnered two Academy Award nominations for Best Actor in a Leading Role (James Woods) and Best Writing, Screenplay Written Directly for the Screen at the 59th Academy Awards ceremony.

Home media
The Region 1 special edition DVD was released on 5 June 2001, and includes the following bonus features:
Commentary by director Oliver Stone
62-minute documentary "Into the Valley of Death"
Eight deleted scenes
46 production photos
Original theatrical trailer

References

External links

1986 films
1980 murders of U.S. missionaries in El Salvador
1980s war drama films
American war drama films
Cultural depictions of Óscar Romero
Films scored by Georges Delerue
Films about journalists
Films about Latin American military dictatorships
Biographical films about war correspondents
Films directed by Oliver Stone
Films about the Salvadoran Civil War
Films produced by Oliver Stone
Films with screenplays by Oliver Stone
1986 drama films
Guerrilla warfare in film
1980s English-language films
1980s American films